Sea of Love may refer to

 Sea of Love (film), a 1989 American thriller film
 "Sea of Love" (Phil Phillips song), a 1959 song by Phil Phillips and The Twilights, covered by many performers
 "Sea of Love" (The National song), 2013
 The Sea of Love, a 1988 album by the Adventures
 Sea of Love, a 2002 album by Fly to the Sky
 Sea of Love, an upcoming 2022 animated Netflix children's series by Juck Somsaman
 Sea of Love (festival), now the See You Festival, an annual techno music festival in Freiburg im Breisgau, Germany